Misuraca is an Italian surname. Notable people with the surname include:

Gianvito Misuraca (born 1990), Italian footballer
Giuseppe Misuraca (1884–1962), Catholic archbishop and diplomat
Mike Misuraca (born 1968), American baseball player

Italian-language surnames